Anastasiya Kharlanova (born 22 October 1992) is a Belarusian football forward currently playing for FC Minsk in the Belarusian Premier League.

International goals

Honours 
FC Minsk
Winner
 Belarusian Premier League (2): 2013, 2014
 Belarusian Women's Cup (2): 2013, 2014
 Belarusian Women's Super Cup: 2014

External links 
 

1992 births
Living people
Belarusian women's footballers
FC Minsk (women) players
Women's association football forwards
Belarus women's international footballers